Devlet Bahçeli (born 1 January 1948) is a Turkish politician, economist, former deputy prime minister, and current chairman of the far-right, ultranationalist Nationalist Movement Party (MHP).

An academic in economics from Gazi University, Bahçeli is a founder of the Grey Wolves, and was elected as the chairman of the MHP in the first congress held after the death of Alparslan Türkeş in 1997. He entered parliament for the first time in the 1999 general election as a deputy from Osmaniye, taking part as deputy prime minister in DSP-MHP-ANAP coalition between 1999 and 2002, and ultimately brought the government down. He resigned from his position as chairman when his party fell below the 10% electoral threshold in the 2002 general election, but was re-elected chairman in the 2003 congress. Bahçeli and his party have been serving in the Grand National Assembly since regaining their seats in parliament in 2007.

Bahçeli was initially a fierce critic of Recep Tayyip Erdoğan throughout the 2000s and 2010s until an interparty crisis occurred following MHP's poor performance in the November 2015 general election. With Bahçeli's newfound closeness to Erdoğan after the crisis, a schism occurred in MHP which culminated in Meral Akşener founding the Good Party in 2017.

Bahçeli formed an electoral alliance with the AKP called the People's Alliance for the 2018 general election and maintained this alliance in the 2019 local elections. MHP currently supports president Erdoğan's cabinet with confidence and supply in the Grand National Assembly. Bahçeli has been described as a kingmaker in Turkish politics.

Early life 
Devlet Bahçeli was born on 1 January, 1948, in the rural district of Bahçe in the province of Osmaniye. According to his own account, Bahçeli belonged to a well established Turkmen family known as "Fettahoğulları", and is one of the four children of his family, with two siblings from his father's first marriage. According to Hrant Dink, he also has Armenian ancestry, in spite of his fervently anti-Armenian views.

His father, Salih Bahçeli, was one of the well-known farmers and merchants of Osmaniye. His mother's name was Samiye. Devlet's father grew up in a left-wing family, and was a supporter of İsmet İnönü and the Republican People's Party.

Education 
He completed his primary education at 7 Ocak Primary School in his hometown of Osmaniye. Devlet attended secondary school with his elder brother Servet, in Adana Private Çukurova College. He lived with his relatives in İstanbul for his high school education and enrolled in Emirgan Akgün College. In his second year of high school, Bahçeli transferred to Private Ata College in Etiler and received his high school diploma from this school. He was accepted into Gazi University in 1967 and graduated from its Foreign Trade Department in 1971.

Bahçeli worked as an assistant in the department of economics at Gazi University and affiliated high schools in 1972. During this period he was one of the founders of the Idealist Association of Financiers and Economists, and one of the founders and chairman of the Association of University Academy and Schools Assistants (UMID-BIR). He also founded and was leader of the University Academy and Schools Assistantship Association (ÜNAY). He received his doctorate in economics from Gazi University Institute of Social Sciences and continued lecturing in the department of economic policy at the Faculty of Economics and Administrative Sciences of the same university until 1987. Dr. Bahçeli was also interested in Turkish history, economics, and foreign policy while working for his degree.

Early political career 
In his youth, Bahçeli attended Alparslan Türkeş's seminars, chairman of the Republican Villagers Nation Party, the predecessor of the Nationalist Movement Party (MHP). While he was still a student at Gazi University in 1967, he worked as the founder and manager of the Grey Wolves. He served as the general secretary of the National Turkish Students' Union between 1970–1971.

After the 1980 coup Bahçeli defended executives and members of the MHP and other nationalist organizations who were imprisoned. Bahçeli resigned from his teaching position in 1987, when Türkeş requested his involvement in party politics, and was elected general secretary of the Nationalist Task Party (MÇP) in their 1987 congress. Bahçeli served in several positions in the upper echelons of MÇP and MHP at various times.

Leader of MHP 
After the death of Alparslan Türkeş in May 1997 an Extraordinary Congress was held, in which Bahçeli contested Alparslan's son Tuğrul Türkeş for the chairmanship. In the following hours of the congress, all candidates except Türkeş withdrew from the candidacy in favor of Bahçeli. However the congress was postponed due to a fight between the two nationalists and their supporters. At another extraordinary congress held in July, Devlet Bahçeli won the run-off election against Tuğrul Türkeş and was elected the new chairman of MHP.

Deputy prime minister 

With a new leader, MHP increased its vote share from 8.18% to 17.98% in 1999 election, its highest vote rate in its history and became the second largest party. Devlet Bahçeli served as a deputy prime minister in the subsequent coalition government (DSP-Motherland-MHP) of Bülent Ecevit. Bahçeli announced on 7 July 2002 of his withdrawal of support for the government, calling for new elections to be held on 3 November, and campaigned for fixing Turkey's economy in the lead up to the general election. However MHP was expelled from parliament for not passing the 10% electoral threshold in the 2002 election, polling 8%. Bahçeli resigned his chairmanship, announcing "I am the only one responsible for the failure", but was reelected in the party's 2003 congress in a competition between Ramiz Ongun, Koray Aydın, and Aytekin Yıldırım.

Opposition 
Bahçeli was again re-elected as MHP chairman in a congress held on 19 November 2006. In the 2007 general election, he and his party reentered parliament, receiving 14.27% of the votes. Bahçeli campaigned in the 2011 general election promising 7% GDP growth and a change in electoral laws. MHP's vote share decreased to 13%. Bahçeli was re-elected as the chairman in party congresses held in 2012 and 2015.

The slogan of the election campaign used by the MHP for the June 2015 general election was “Bizimle yürü Türkiye!” (Walk with us, Turkey!) Among the election promises, Bahçeli called for raising the minimum wage to 1400 TL, that pensioners would be given a bonus of 1400 TL twice a year, and that terrorism would be eradicated. MHP increased their vote more than 3%, bringing it to 16.29%. The election produced a hung parliament, so AKP, CHP, MHP, and HDP engaged in coalition talks which ended up falling through, so another election was called. When campaigning for the election held on 1 November 2015 Bahçeli promised a 250 lira rent aid would be given to families without a home, and a crescent card would be given to families in need. MHP's position faltered and received less than 12% of the votes.

MHP congress controversy (2015–2017) 

Following MHP's defeat in the 2015 election, high ranking MHP members demanded Bahçeli's resignation as chairman. When he refused, 547 delegates put forward their demands to convene an extraordinary congress. Important names such as Meral Akşener, Sinan Oğan, and Koray Aydın called for a congress and announced that they were candidates for the chairmanship, however Bahçeli rejected the calls for an extraordinary congress and announced 18 March 2018 as the date of a regular congress.  A lawsuit was filed by Bahçeli's opposition on the grounds that their demands were not met and that the party be taken to an extraordinary congress. The party leadership requested the Constitutional Court to make a decision. The court ruled in favor of Bahçeli's opponents, mandating MHP to convene an extraordinary congress with the Supreme Court unanimously approving the decision. The 6th Extraordinary Grand Congress of the MHP convened on 19 June 2016 with the participation of six candidates who declared their candidacy against Bahçeli. In the congress, which was officially a bylaws convention, it was confirmed that a number of amendments to the party's charter had been decided on, even though the headquarters claimed otherwise. With the amendment proposals accepted in the congress, 13 articles in the party bylaws were renewed. Among the amendments, an article in MHP's charter which prevented the election of chairmen in extraordinary congresses was changed to allow so. However the execution of the decisions reached in the convention was stopped with the decision of the Court of Cassation. Following this decision of the Supreme Court of Appeals, Akşener filed a complaint with the Supreme Election Council (YSK) for 'complete unlawfulness' regarding the rejection of the request for an extraordinary congress with elections.

Names such as Meral Akşener, Yusuf Halaçoğlu and Ümit Özdağ were soon expelled from MHP with the decision of the MHP Disciplinary Committee. On October 25, 2017 Good Party was founded by the MHP expellees under the leadership of Akşener.

People's Alliance 
Bahçeli supported President Recep Tayyip Erdoğan in the 2017 constitutional amendment referendum.

In 2018, an electoral alliance between the AKP and MHP called the People's Alliance was established in preparation for that years general election. A law was then passed enabling political parties to form alliances in elections. Bahçeli stated that he was not running for president and that MHP would support Erdoğan's candidacy. Erdoğan was reelected president, and MHP received 11% of the votes and 49 deputies entered the parliament. Bahçeli congratulated Erdoğan for the victory and declared that the MHP had achieved a historical success. MHP has since been giving confidence and supply to an AKP minority government.In the 2019 local elections, MHP again entered the elections under the umbrella of the People's Alliance. MHP did not nominate candidates for the İstanbul, Ankara and İzmir mayoralties and supported the candidates nominated by the AKP. Erdoğan stated that he saw this move of the MHP as a 'gesture' and that they will respond. The AKP did not nominate a candidate for mayor in Adana, Mersin, Manisa, Kırklareli and Osmaniye. MHP won the mayorships of Amasya, Kastamonu, Kütahya, Çankırı, Erzincan, Bayburt, Bartın and Karabük provinces. Bahçeli has been re-elected as MHP chairman in the congresses held in 2018 and 2021.

Speeches 
Bahçeli made his most famous speech in 2009, which was the 40th anniversary of the Nationalist Movement Party:

Political positions 
Bahçeli accused Russia of murdering Turkish soldiers, who were shot in an accident by Russian fighter planes in 2017. He said; "Russia shoots our soldiers, then disgusts them. This is a mistaken, shameful, international law said to count". In March 2022, after the Russian invasion of Ukraine, he urged Russia to "stop the invasion immediately", adding that "the attempt to take Donbas away from Ukraine is separatism".

He is critical of the pro-Kurdish Peoples Democratic Party (HDP), which he demands to be banned. When the Constitutional Court turnd down a indictment for the banning of the party, he demanded the closure of the court.

Controversies 
In 2015 a Uyghur-staffed, Turkish-owned Chinese restaurant was assaulted by Turkish nationalists; they also attacked the Dutch consulate, mistaking it for the Russian consulate, and assaulted several South Korean tourists, believing them to be Chinese. Devlet Bahçeli said that the attacks by MHP affiliated Turkish youth on South Korean tourists was "understandable", telling the Turkish news paper Hürriyet that: "What is the difference between a Korean and a Chinese anyway? They both have slitty eyes. Does it make any difference?"

After an amassing of Greek and Turkish troops at the border amid rising tensions between the two countries, Bahçeli accused Greek defense minister Panos Kammenos of being mentally ill, proclaiming that he should "visit a clinic" among other insults.

Following the recognition of the Armenian Genocide by the German Parliament, has stated that the deportations of Armenians were "absolutely correct" and should be repeated if a similar event occurs. Bahçeli has also glorified the Three Pashas, perpetrators of the Armenian Genocide, on numerous occasions. After Joe Biden became the first US President to officially acknowledge the Armenian genocide on April 24, 2021, Bahçeli threatened Armenians living in Turkey, Turkish leftists, and Turkish citizens who recognized the genocide, with death, stating "When you look at us, we will make sure that you will see Talaat, Enver Pasha, and Mustafa Kemal Atatürk." He also denied that there were any genocides or massacres in Turkey's history.

He has close ties to mafia boss Alaettin Çakıcı who he visited in prison, and for who he demanded a general amnesty. The demand was denied by Erdoğan.

Personal life 
Bahçeli is unmarried. He supported the football team Beşiktaş until 2023, but canceled his membership in the club after fans demanded the Government to resign over its deficient response to the earthquake on the February 2023 during its match against Konyaspor. He has a house in Osmanye, which was not destroyed during the earthquake of February 2023.

Works 

 2011 Seçim Beyannamesi
 Türkiye Gündemi ve Genelgeler
 Gizli Gündemler “Demokrasi, Özgürlük, Anayasa”
 Millet ve Devlet Bekası İçin Güç Birliği
 Referanduma Doğru İstanbul’da Bayramlaşma
 Ülkü ve Şuur
 Bölücü Terörün Siyasallaşma Süreci (Yıkım Projesi)
 Bin Yıllık Kardeşliği “Yaşa ve Yaşat” Mitingi
 “Var Ol Türkiye” MHP 9. Olağan Büyük Kurultayı
 Çözülen Ülke Türkiye ve Tavrımız
 Çözülen Ülke Türkiye ve Ülkümüz
 MHP 40. Yıl - Bir Hilal Uğruna
 Ortak Akılda Buluşma
 Siyasi Hayat ve Normalleşme Süreci
 Yönetilmeyen Türkiye “Kutuplaşma, Kargaşa ve Kaos”
 Teslimiyet ve Açılım Siyaseti “Demokrasi, Ekonomi, Güvenlik”
 Terör Kıskacında Türkiye: Tarihi Uyarı

See also 

 Separatist kebabists

References

External links

1948 births
Living people
People from Bahçe, Osmaniye
Nationalist Movement Party politicians
Deputy Prime Ministers of Turkey
Gazi University alumni
Academic staff of Gazi University
Turkish nationalists
Members of the 25th Parliament of Turkey
Members of the 24th Parliament of Turkey
Members of the 23rd Parliament of Turkey
Members of the 21st Parliament of Turkey
Members of the 57th government of Turkey
Turkish Sunni Muslims
Leaders of political parties in Turkey
Deniers of the Armenian genocide
Far-right politics in Turkey
Turkish people of Armenian descent